The 2013–14 Maryland Terrapins men's basketball team represented the University of Maryland, College Park in 2013–14 NCAA Division I men's basketball season as a member of the Atlantic Coast Conference (ACC). They were led by third year head coach Mark Turgeon and played their home games at the Comcast Center. They finished the season 17–15, 9–9 in ACC play to finish in a three way tie for seventh place. They lost in the second round of the ACC tournament to Florida State.

This was the final season that Maryland competed in the ACC, as they joined the Big Ten Conference on July 1, 2014.

Pre-season

Departures

Class of 2013 signees

Roster

Schedule and results

|-
!colspan=12 style="background:#CE1126; color:#FFFFFF;"| Bahamas exhibition tour

|-
!colspan=12 style="background:#CE1126; color:#FFFFFF;"| Exhibition

|-
!colspan=12 style="background:#CE1126; color:#FFFFFF;"| Non-conference regular season

|-

|-
!colspan=12 style="background:#CE1126; color:#FFFFFF;"| ACC tournament

References
umterps.com
ESPN

Maryland Terrapins men's basketball seasons
Maryland
Terra
Terra